Jane's Defence Weekly (abbreviated as JDW) is a weekly magazine reporting on military and corporate affairs, edited by Peter Felstead. It is one of a number of military-related publications named after John F. T. Jane, an Englishman who first published Jane's All the World's Fighting Ships in 1898. It is a unit of Jane's Information Group, which was purchased by IHS in 2007. The magazine has a large circulation and is frequently cited in publications worldwide.

History
Jane's Defence Weekly was established in 1984 replacing the now-defunct Jane's Defence Review. The latter was started in 1978 and was published on a monthly basis.

Samuel Loring Morison
In 1984, only months after the magazine was established, Jane's Defence Weekly gained worldwide attention after printing several images from an American spy satellite of the Nikolaiev 444 shipyard in the Black Sea, showing a Kiev-class aircraft carrier under construction. The images were leaked by Samuel Loring Morison, an American intelligence professional, leading to the only conviction ever passed against a US government official for giving classified information to the press.

References

External links
 

1984 establishments in the United Kingdom
Aviation magazines
Weekly magazines published in the United Kingdom
Magazines established in 1984
Military magazines published in the United Kingdom
Mass media in Surrey